The national parks of South Korea are preserved parcels of public land on which most forms of development are prohibited. They cover a total of 6.6% of the country's area, and are typically located in mountainous or coastal regions. The country's largest mountain park is Jirisan National Park in the southwest; this was also the first national park to be designated in 1967. The smallest park is Wolchulsan, with an area of only .

As of 2016, there are 22 national parks in South Korea; the parks, with the exception of Hallasan National Park, are managed by the Korea National Park Service, established in 1987. The Authority operates its own police force, and since 1998 has been under the jurisdiction of the Ministry of Environment. It was previously under the jurisdiction of the Ministry of Construction.

History 
Early on, admission to national parks in South Korea was free. In 1974, most of South Korea's national parks cancelled the free admission policy. Currently only Gyeongju National Park is free. In 1993, the ticket revenue of the Korean National Park accounted for 65% of the park's total revenue. With the increase in the number of tourists year by year, the Korean government has restricted the number of tourists and activities in order to effectively protect the natural environment of the park, and controlled the number of tourists through an appointment system. Picnic and camping for tourists can only be carried out in designated areas, and night climbing is strictly prohibited. In addition, South Korea has imposed a natural rest program on some areas of high conservation value in national parks to avoid man-made damage.

References

External links

Korea National Park Service, manager of 21 of the 22 national parks

 
South Korea
South Korea geography-related lists
National parks